Lavert Hill (born October 3, 1998) is an American football cornerback for the St. Louis BattleHawks of the XFL. He helped Martin Luther King High School earn the 2015 Michigan High School Athletic Association Division 2 championship and played in the 2016 U.S. Army All-American Bowl. He was recognized as the Lockheed Martin Air Defender of the Year as the nation's top high school defensive back. As a junior at Michigan, he was a 2018 All-Big Ten first-team selection by both the coaches and media. He is the younger brother of Lano Hill.

Early career
In January 2015 Hill gave a verbal commitment to Penn State and transferred from Cass Technical High School to Martin Luther King High School. In November 2015, Hill decommitted from Penn State. As a high school senior, Hill tallied 12 interceptions (3 for touchdowns). Hill made several catches, including two touchdowns as part of Martin Luther King's comeback victory in the 2015 Michigan High School Athletic Association Class 2 championship game over Lowell High School. His brother, Lano, had won two Michigan High School Athletic Association championships at Cass Tech. Lavert Hill was a participant in the 2016 U.S. Army All-American Bowl. He earned the Lockeed Martin Air Defender of the Year honor as the top defensive back in the national class of 2016. On February 2, 2016, he signed with Michigan with the anticipation of playing in the same defensive backfield as his brother for the first time.

College career
Hill's mentors at Michigan were Cass Tech alums cornerback Jourdan Lewis and his safety brother. He made his debut on September 3, 2016, against Hawaii in the season opener as one of 17 true freshmen to appear in the game. Hill's first career start was for the 2017 Michigan Wolverines football team against Florida on September 2, 2017. He had an interception return for a touchdown a week later against Cincinnati. Following the season Hill earned 2017 All-Big Ten team recognition from the coaches (second-team) and the media (honorable mention). His brother, Lano, had been a second-team (coaches) and honorable mention (media) honoree for the 2016 All-Big Ten team. On October 13, 2018, against Wisconsin, Hill recorded a 21-yard interception return for a touchdown. He became the third player in Michigan program history to register two interception returns for touchdowns, following Lance Dottin and Thom Darden. Following the 2018 season, Hill was named to the 2018 All-Big Ten defensive first-team by both the coaches and media. During the 2019 season, Hill led the Big Ten in passer rating against (23.9 passer rating allowed), and made 15 tackles with a team-leading 12 pass breakups (nine breakups, three interceptions). Following the season, Hill was named to the 2019 All-Big Ten defensive first-team by both the coaches and media.

Professional career

Kansas City Chiefs
Hill signed with the Kansas City Chiefs as an undrafted free agent on April 26, 2020. He was waived during final roster cuts on September 5, 2020. He was signed to the practice squad the following day. He was released on November 24, 2020.

Philadelphia Eagles
On December 8, 2020, Hill was signed to the Philadelphia Eagles practice squad. He signed a reserve/future contract with the Eagles on January 4, 2021. He was waived on August 23, 2021.

Arizona Cardinals
On October 26, 2021, Hill was signed to the Arizona Cardinals practice squad. He was released on November 1.

San Francisco 49ers
On December 15, 2021, Hill was signed to the San Francisco 49ers.

Cleveland Browns
On August 5, 2022, Hill signed with the Cleveland Browns. Hill was waived with an injured designation on August 30, 2022; after clearing waivers, he reverted to the Browns' injured reserve list on August 31, 2022. He was released on September 9.

References

External links
Michigan bio

1998 births
Living people
Players of American football from Detroit
Cass Technical High School alumni
Martin Luther King High School (Detroit) alumni
American football defensive backs
Michigan Wolverines football players
Kansas City Chiefs players
Philadelphia Eagles players
Arizona Cardinals players
San Francisco 49ers players
Cleveland Browns players